Bozburun is a small seaside town with own municipality in Marmaris district, in southwestern Turkey. The permanent population is about 2000. It is situated on the coast of the peninsula of the same name (Bozburun Peninsula) which extends in parallel to Datça Peninsula in the south. The town faces across the sea the town of Datça and the Greek island of Symi (Sömbeki in Turkish) 

Although quieter than Marmaris bay's two centers of tourism of international renown (Marmaris and İçmeler), Bozburun is a precious discovery for visitors who take the good but curvy road about  further in partance of Marmaris, due to its natural beauties and the exceptional flora. Tourism, fishing, sponge diving and apiculture are the main means of livelihood for its inhabitants. Its thyme honey is famous across Turkey. It has a small yet lovely harbor is also one of the key stops on the popular nautical tourism route of Blue Cruise. 
Its pristine sea is surrounded by coves. Bozburun is also well known in the region for its expert construction gulets, on a par with Bodrum and Güllük.

In ancient times, Bozburun region was famous for its marble quarries, which is at the origin of one of the explanations given for the name Marmaris. The quarries were in activity until the times of the 19th century traveller Charles Texier who mentions them. Marble has been a very important export product for the entire region of present-day Muğla Province since ages, with rich reserves starting from ancient Knidos at the tip of Datça Peninsula to inland Kavaklıdere's modern installations in full activity in our day. There are no quarries in Bozburun presently, but research is being pursued, sometimes also by referring to historic documents and traces, to locate them.

See also
 Turkish Riviera
 Blue Cruise
 Marinas in Turkey
 Foreign purchases of real estate in Turkey

External links

Bozburun

Populated places in Muğla Province
Towns in Turkey
Turkish Riviera
Populated coastal places in Turkey
Fishing communities in Turkey